Nkechi Blessing Sunday  (born 14 February 1989) is an America-based Nigerian actor, film producer, film director, and screenwriter, born and raised in Surulere, Lagos State. She produced her first movie, Omoge Lekki in 2015, starring herself, alongside Yinka Quadri. In 2016, Omoge Lekki won MAYA Awards and she was nominated for Revelation of the Year at Best of Nollywood Awards.

She also serves as the director and chief executive officer of Nkechi films production, and NBS Foundation.

Early life
Nkechi Blessing Sunday is from one of the communities in the 17 local government areas in  Abia, a State in the South East region of Nigeria. She had her primary education at Olu Abiodun Nursery and Primary school, Lagos and her secondary education at Barachel Model College, Lagos. She did a six-month diploma in theatre arts at the Lagos State University, and studied International Relations at Houdegbe North American University.

In 2008, after she graduated from Lagos State University, her friend "Kemi Korede" discovered Nkechi passion for acting and featured her in her movie "Omo Bewaji". Omo Bewaji became a minor break for her career and led to her meeting with Emeka Duru, who offered her a supporting role in Emem Isong movie; Through The Fire & Entanglement in 2009.

She rose to prominence in 2012, with a lead role on Kafila Omo Ibadan, after her meeting with the producer, Temitope Bali in South Africa, who offered her the role on Kafila Omo Ibadan. On 1 February 2017, The Nigeria Carnival USA, unveiled her as one of its ambassadors at the second edition of the yearly Nigeria music, cultural and comedy event in the United States of America. In 2018, she played the role "Dora" in the ghost film The Ghost and the Tout, which also landed her an award at the 2018 City People Movie Award for Most Promising Actress of the Year. In 2020, Nkechi Blessing co-hosted the 2020 edition of the African Entertainment Awards USA with Seun Sean Jimoh. Same year, she was in the cast of Fate of Alakada as the character of Bisi. She starred with a lead role on Tanwa Savage, The Cleanser, Omo Emi, and Ise Ori, and a supporting role on Breaded Life, and Olori Amolegbe.

Personal life

On 10 June 2021, Nkechi Blessing, confirms her marriage between her, and the Ekiti politician, Falegan Opeyemi David, after she shared photos from their wedding on his birthday via her Instagram Story. On 23 September 2021, she lost her mum "Gloria Obasi Sunday", while at the verge of launching her premium movies in Lagos biggest theatre.

On 6 April 2022, Nkechi Blessing posted on her Instagram handle that she had ended her 10 months old marital relationship with Falegan Opeyemi David.

Filmography
List of filmographies by Nkechi Blessing Sunday.

Produced

Awards and nominations

References

External links
 

Living people
Nigerian film actresses
Actresses in Yoruba cinema
21st-century Nigerian actresses
Yoruba actresses
1989 births
Actresses from Lagos
Nigerian film award winners
Igbo people
Nigerian film directors
Nigerian film producers
Nigerian screenwriters
People from Abia State
Nigerian chief executives
Lagos State University alumni
Nigerian media personalities
Nigerian media executives